Ergamenes is the hellenized name of a Nubian king of Meroë reported by Agatharchides in Diodorus Siculus (3.2.6, FHN II No. 142). According to this account, Ergamenes reigned in Meroë during the friendly Egyptian reign of Ptolemy II Philadelphus to Ptolemy IV Philopator, was instructed in Greek philosophy, favored Greek art and its way of life, although it could be rather intended as a cultural influence from a Ptolemaic-governed Egypt. He resented the tradition of ancient Egypt and the Ethiopian priests' control over the King's power and preferred the absolute power of his neighbor, Ptolemy II:

Identification
Ergamenes was tentatively identified with many archaeologically known king of Meroë, above all two kings with similar names, Arakamani and Arqamani. This situation has led to cause these two kings to be called Ergamenes I (Arakamani) and Ergamenes II (Arqamani). Although it is possible that – in a way similar to the semi-mythological Sesostris – Greeks conflated several rulers into a single figure named Ergamenes, Egyptologist Fritz Hintze and Meroitologist László Török believes that the original Ergamenes should be identified with Arakamani.

References

László Török, Between Two Worlds: The Frontier Region Between Ancient Nubia and Egypt 3700 BC – 500 AD, Brill, 2008, .

Kings of Kush